The Indonesia Investment Authority (INA) is the sovereign wealth fund of Indonesia. The INA was founded by the Indonesian Government in 2021 to strengthen the country's economy by diversifying into new asset classes. INA was launched in February, 2021, with a target of managing $24.5 billion of assets. Unlike sovereign wealth funds of other countries which manage excess oil revenues or foreign exchange reserves, the INA seeks foreign funds as co-investors to finance the country's economic development.

INA had received commitments of up to $10 billion prior to its launch from global companies and agencies such as the U.S. International Development Finance Corporation and the Japan Bank for International Cooperation, as well as a few foreign pension funds. The Indonesian government will support the fund with $5 billion in cash and other assets. The United Arab Emirates has announced a plan to invest $10 billion in INA

Governance
INA reports directly to the President of Indonesia. The supervisory board is headed by the Finance Minister, the State Owned Enterprises Minister is also a member of the board.

Board of Directors
CEO - Ridha Wirakusumah
Deputy CEO - Arief Budiman
Investment Director - Stefanus Ade Hadiwidjaja
Risk Director - Marita Alisjahbana
Finance Director - Eddy Purwanto

Supervisory Board
Chairwoman and Supervisor - Finance Minister Sri Mulyani (ex officio)
Supervisor - State Owned Enterprises Minister Erick Thohir (ex-officio)
Supervisor - Darwin Cyril Noerhadi
Supervisor - Yozua Makes
Supervisor - Hariyanto Sahari

References

Sovereign wealth funds
Financial services companies of Indonesia
2021 establishments in Indonesia
Government agencies established in 2021
Government-owned companies of Indonesia